William Woolfolk (June 25, 1917 – July 20, 2003) was an American writer known for his range of writing output, having achieved success in the areas of comic books, novels, and television screenwriting. A graduate of New York University, Woolfolk went to work in advertising before joining the comic book industry in the 1940s.

Comic books

Woolfolk worked in the comic book business, starting with MLJ Magazines, from 1941 through 1954, with time out for military service. He rose in the business to become one of the highly paid writers of comic books, earning $300 a week, ten times the average salary. Woolfolk toiled for several companies, including Detective Comics (Batman and Superman); Fawcett Comics (Bulletman, Captain Marvel and Captain Marvel Jr.); Quality Comics (Blackhawk); Police Comics (Plastic Man); and Timely Comics, the precursor to Marvel Comics (Captain America and the Sub-Mariner). He is credited with creating Captain Marvel's "Holy Moley!" catchphrase. He also worked for Archie Comics, National Comics and Orbit Publications.

After military service in the Army during World War II, he became a freelance magazine writer, eventually joining the staff of Shock Illustrated. Woolfolk also created O.W. Comics and the astronautics magazine Space World. He became famed as "The Shakespeare of Comics" during the Golden Age of Comics. After a decade of working at Fawcett, Detective Comics editor Mort Weisinger hired Woolfolk for Superman, a marketplace rival of Captain Marvel, one of the titles Woolfolk worked on. At the same time of his hiring, he was also working for Orbit and Timely and freelancing articles and stories to mainstream magazines. He accepted the offer to gain security. However, he clashed with Weisinger and continued to freelance with a wide variety of publishers.

At the request of Kable News, he became a periodical publisher in 1955, launching the monthly gossip magazine Inside Story as a rival to Confidential. It eventually became the second best-selling scandal sheet in the trade. He eventually left publishing for novel writing and to work in television.

Woolworth told the anthology Contemporary Authors:
"Writing during the so-called Golden Age of comics, I soon became the best paid and most sought-after writer (there was little competition) in the field. I wrote for all the characters now so nostalgically remembered: Captain Marvel, Superman, Batman, Captain Midnight, Blackhawk, Plastic Man and many others. This work paid so well, was so easy to do, and so much fun, that my versatility might have come to an end forever. But the Golden Age passed, and I moved on."

In 2002, he was awarded the Inkpot Award at Comic-Con International.

Television writer
Woolfolk became a TV screenwriter, primarily working on the courtroom drama The Defenders, where he also was a script editor. A 1965 episode he wrote, "All the Silent Voices", was one of the first to deal with birth control. In 1964, he was nominated for Writers Guild of America award in 1964 for Episodic TV Drama for The Defenders episode "A Book for Burning".

He also worked on the crime drama Arrest and Trial, a show that was a forerunner of Law & Order. In the first half of each 90-minute episode, a detective (Ben Gazzara) investigated a crime, while in the second half, a member of the District Attorney's office (Chuck Connors) tried the case. The series lasted only one season in 1963–1964.

Novelist
Though his first novel, The Naked Hunter, was published in 1953, it was not until 1962 that he published his first hardcover book, when Doubleday issued My Name is Morgan (1962), which was based on the life of Mike Todd. Most of his novels dealt with characters based on actual people, romans à clef limning the lives of celebrities, including "The Beautiful Couple" (1968), a bestseller evocative of the life of Todd's former wife Elizabeth Taylor and her fifth husband Richard Burton; The Builders (1969), based on the construction of the Seagram Building, featured characters based on the Modernist architect William Lescaze and the real estate developer William Zeckendorf; and Maggie (1971), based on the relationship of newspaper publisher William Randolph Hearst and his movie star mistress Marion Davies.

Woolfolk wrote TV tie-ins based on the Batman TV series: Batman vs. Three Villains of Doom (1966) (an amalgamation of three older comic-book stories, updated with elements from the TV series) and Batman vs. the Fearsome Foursome (a direct novelization of the feature film based on the series). He also wrote nonfiction: The Great American Birth Rite (1975), co-authored with his wife Joanna Martine Woolfolk, about child raising; and Daddy's Little Girl: The Unspoken Bargain Between Fathers and Their Daughters (1982), co-written with his daughter, the novelist Donna Woolfolk Cross (Pope Joan).

Woolfolk died of congestive heart failure in Syracuse, New York, in 2003. At the time of his death, his novels had sold over six million copies, and eight had been selected by the Book of the Month Club.

In his interview with Contemporary Authors, Woolworth summed up his writing career:
No literary monuments have ever been erected that proclaim: 'He was versatile'. No one looks forward to a new book by William Woolfolk because no one, including the author, knows what it will be.

He claimed that his comic books work outshone his other literary production.

References

1917 births
2003 deaths
20th-century American male writers
20th-century American novelists
20th-century American screenwriters
American comics writers
American male novelists
American male television writers
New York University alumni
People from Center Moriches, New York
Screenwriters from New York (state)
Writers from Syracuse, New York
Inkpot Award winners